City of Daughters is the second studio album by Destroyer, released in June 1998.

Pitchfork Media listed City of Daughters as 86th best album of the 1990s.

Track listing

Personnel
Dan Bejar - Guitar, Synthesizer, Vocals
John Collins - Bass, Synthesizer, technology, Ambiance
Scott Morgan - Drums, saxophone, clarinet
David James - technology on "Space Race"

References

External links
Pitchfork Media #86 album of the 1990s

1998 albums
Destroyer (band) albums
Albums produced by John Collins (Canadian musician)